Mississippi Highway 617 (MS 617) is a short unsigned state highway in southern Mississippi. Its southern terminus is in the Port of Pascagoula. The road was constructed in 1973, and an interchange was added at US 90 around 1993. MS 617 was designated on July 1, 2002, and no significant changes were made since.

Route description
All of the divided highway is located in Pascagoula, Jackson County. MS 617 starts near parking lots in an industry area inside the Port of Pascagoula. The route, known as Plymouth Street, travels north past an unnamed street. Soon, it intersects MS 619, a causeway to Singing River Island. MS 617 then crosses a bridge over a CSX railroad. Immediately after that, the road meets US 90 at a trumpet interchange, reaching its northern terminus.

In 2013, Mississippi Department of Transportation (MDOT) calculated as many as 20,000 vehicles traveling north of MS 619, and as few as 6,400 vehicles traveling north of US 90. MS 617 is not included as a part of the National Highway System (NHS), a network of highways identified as being most important for the economy, mobility and defense of the nation. The route is legally defined in Mississippi Code § 65-3-3, and is maintained by MDOT. MS 617 is also designated as Jerry St. Pe' Highway.

History

A road was built between 1971 and 1973, extending from the port to US 90. It was removed from the maps in 1984, and was added back in 1993–94 as Mississippi Highway 993 (MS 993), with a new interchange at US 90. On July 1, 2002, the Mississippi Legislature designated the route MS 617, and named it as "Jerry St. Pe' Highway". The route has not changed significantly since.

Major intersections

References

External links

617
Transportation in Jackson County, Mississippi